Fox is a Serbian pay television channel broadcast in Serbia, Bosnia and Herzegovina, Montenegro, and North Macedonia, owned by Fox Networks Group. It was launched on 15 October 2012 and features programming from Fox, BBC, ABC and Freeform. On 9 May 2013, the channel launched its own HD simulcast feed.

Programming 
 The Simpsons 
 Family Guy
 Bones 
 The X-Files 
 Archer  
 Sinbad   
 Raising Hope 
 Last Man Standing 
 Empire
 The X Factor 
 Homeland
 Misfits
 Lie to Me
 Everybody Loves Raymond
 Mental
 American Horror Story
 Out There
 Wilfred
 America's Funniest Home Videos
 The Borgias
 Continuum
 The Gates
 Dollhouse
 Buffy the Vampire Slayer
 Modern Family
 Sleepy Hollow
 Awake
 Agents of S.H.I.E.L.D.
 Louie
 The Listener
 Graceland
 The Crazy Ones
 The Millers
 Wayward Pines
 Castle
 The Strain
 Brickleberry
 Malcolm in the Middle
 Dexter
 The Walking Dead
 Scream Queens (2015 TV series)

References

External links

Television stations in Serbia
Television channels in North Macedonia
Television channels and stations established in 2012
Serbia